Mulsantina cyathigera is a species of lady beetle in the family Coccinellidae. It is found in Central America and North America, from Guatemala through Mexico to southern United States. It measures  in length.

References

Further reading

 

Coccinellidae
Beetles of Central America
Beetles of North America
Beetles described in 1891
Articles created by Qbugbot